The Muisca Confederation was a loose confederation of different Muisca rulers (zaques, zipas, iraca, and tundama) in the central Andean highlands of present-day Colombia before the Spanish conquest of northern South America. The area, presently called Altiplano Cundiboyacense, comprised the current departments of Boyacá, Cundinamarca and minor parts of Santander.

According to some Muisca scholars the Muisca Confederation was one of the best-organized confederations of tribes on the South American continent. Modern anthropologists, such as Jorge Gamboa Mendoza, attribute the present-day knowledge about the confederation and its organization more to a reflection by Spanish chroniclers who predominantly wrote about it a century or more after the Muisca were conquered and proposed the idea of a loose collection of different people with slightly different languages and backgrounds.

Geography

Climate

Muisca Confederation 

In the times before the Spanish conquest of the Muisca, the central part of present-day Colombia; the Eastern Ranges of the Colombian Andes was inhabited by the Muisca people who were organised in a loose confederation of rulers. The central authorities of Bacatá in the south and Hunza in the north were called zipa and zaque respectively. Other rulers were the iraca priest in sacred City of the Sun Sugamuxi, the Tundama of Tundama and various other caciques (chiefs). The Muisca spoke Chibcha, in their own language called Muysccubun; "language of the people".

The Muisca people, different from the other three great civilisations of the Americas; the Maya, Aztec and Inca, did not build grand stone architecture. Their settlements were relatively small and consisted of bohíos; circular houses of wood and clay, organised around a central market square with the house of the cacique in the centre. Roads were present to connect the settlements with each other and with the surrounding indigenous groups, of which the Guane and Lache to the north, the Panche and Muzo to the west and Guayupe, Achagua and Tegua to the east were the most important.

History

Prehistory 

Early Amerindian settlers led a hunter-gatherer life among still extant megafauna living in cool habitats around Pleistocene lakes, of which the humedales in Bogotá, Lake Suesca, Lake Fúquene and Lake Herrera are notable examples. Multiple evidences of late Pleistocene to middle Holocene population of the Bogotá savanna, the high plateau in the Colombian Andes, have been found to date. As is common with caves and rock shelters, Tequendama was inhabited from around 11,000 years BP, and continuing into the prehistorical, Herrera and Muisca periods, making it the oldest site of Colombia, together with El Abra (12,500 BP), located north of Zipaquirá and Tibitó, located within the boundaries of Tocancipá (11,740 BP). The oldest human remains and the oldest complete skeleton were discovered at Tequendama and has been named "Hombre del Tequendama" or Homo Tequendama. Other artefacts have been found in Gachalá (9100 BP), Sueva (Junín) and Zipacón. Just west of the Altiplano, the oldest archaeological remains were found; in Pubenza, part of Tocaima and have been dated at 16,000 years Before Present.

Pre-Columbian era

Herrera Period 

The Herrera Period is a phase in the history of Colombia. It is part of the Andean preceramic and ceramic, time equivalent of the North American pre-Columbian formative and classic stages and age dated by various archaeologists. The Herrera Period predates the age of the Muisca people, who inhabited the Altiplano Cundiboyacense before the Spanish conquest of the Muisca and postdates the lithic formative stage and prehistory of the eastern Andean region in Colombia. The Herrera Period is usually defined as ranging from 800 BCE to 800 AD, although some scholars date it as early as 1500 BCE.

Ample evidence of the Herrera Period has been uncovered on the Altiplano Cundiboyacense and main archaeologists contributing to the present knowledge about the Herrera Period are scholars Ana María Groot, Gonzalo Correal Urrego, Thomas van der Hammen, Carl Henrik Langebaek Rueda, Sylvia M. Broadbent, Marianne Cardale de Schrimpff and others.

Muisca 

The Muisca were polytheistic and their religion and mythology was closely connected with the natural area they were inhabiting. They had a thorough understanding of astronomical parameters and developed a complex luni-solar calendar; the Muisca calendar. According to the calendar they had specific times for sowing, harvest and the organisation of festivals where they sang, danced and played music and drank their national drink chicha in great quantities.

The most respected members of the community were mummified and the mummies were not buried, yet displayed in their temples, in natural locations such as caves and even carried on their backs during warfare to impress their enemies.

Their art is the most famous remnant of their culture, as living spaces, temples and other existing structures have been destroyed by the Spanish who colonised the Muisca territories. A primary example of their fine goldworking is the Muisca raft, together with more objects made of gold, tumbaga, ceramics and cotton displayed in the Museo del Oro in Bogotá, the ancient capital of the southern Muisca.

The Muisca were a predominantly agricultural society with small-scale farmfields, part of more extensive terrains. To diversify their diet, they traded mantles, gold, emeralds and salt for fruits, vegetables, coca, yopo and cotton cultivated in lower altitude warmer terrains populated by their neighbours, the Muzo, Panche, Yarigui, Guane, Guayupe, Achagua, Tegua, Lache, Sutagao and U'wa. Trade of products grown farther away happened with the Calima, Pijao and Caribbean coastal communities around the Sierra Nevada de Santa Marta.

The Muisca economy was self-sufficient regarding the basic supplies, thanks to the advanced technologies of the agriculture on raised terraces by the people. The system of trade was well established providing both the higher social classes and the general population abundances of gold, feathers, marine snails, coca, yopo and other luxury goods. Markets were held every four to eight days in various settlements throughout the Muisca Confederation and special markets were organised around festivities where merchants from far outside the Andes were trading their goods with the Muisca.

Apart from agriculture, the Muisca were well developed in the production of different crafts, using the raw materials traded with surrounding indigenous peoples. Famous are the golden and tumbaga objects made by the Muisca people. Cotton mantles, cloths and nets were made by the Muisca women and traded for valuable goods, tropical fruits and small cotton cloths were used as money. The Muisca were unique in South America for having real coins of gold, called tejuelos.

Mining was an important source of income for the Muisca, who were called "Salt People" because of their salt mines in Zipaquirá, Nemocón and Tausa. Like their western neighbours, the Muzo -who were called "The Emerald People"- they mined emeralds in their territories, mainly in Somondoco. Carbon was found throughout the region of the Muisca in Eocene sediments and used for the fires for cooking and the production of salt and golden ornaments.

The people used a decimal counting system and counted with their fingers. Their system went from 1 to 10 and for higher numerations they used the prefix quihicha or qhicha, which means "foot" in their Chibcha language Muysccubun. Eleven became thus "foot one", twelve "foot two", etc. As in the other pre-Columbian civilizations, the number 20 was special. It was the total number of all body extremities; fingers and toes. The Muisca used two forms to express twenty: "foot ten"; quihícha ubchihica or their exclusive word gueta, derived from gue, which means "house". Numbers between 20 and 30 were counted gueta asaqui ata ("twenty plus one"; 21), gueta asaqui ubchihica ("twenty plus ten"; 30). Larger numbers were counted as multiples of twenty; gue-bosa ("20 times 2"; 40), gue-hisca ("20 times 5"; 100). The Muisca script consisted of hieroglyphs, only used for numerals.

Territorial organization

Bacatá 

 Capital – Bacatá
 Area – 
 Average elevation – 
 Last rulers – zipas Tisquesusa, Sagipa
 Date of conquest – 20 April 1537 (Funza) – Jiménez & Pérez de Quesada
 First city – 6 August 1538 (Bogotá) – Gonzalo Jiménez de Quesada

Chipazaque

Hunza 

 Capital – Hunza
 Area – 
 Average elevation – 
 Last rulers – zaques Quemuenchatocha, Aquiminzaque
 Date of conquest – 20 August 1537 (Hunza) – Jiménez & Pérez de Quesada
 First city – 6 August 1539 (Tunja) – Gonzalo Suárez Rendón

Iraca 

 Capital – Suamox
 Area – 
 Average elevation – 
 Last ruler – iraca Sugamuxi
 Date of conquest – Early September 1537 (Sogamoso) – Jiménez & Pérez de Quesada
 Important settlements – Suamox, Busbanzá, Firavitoba, Gámeza and Tota
 Archaeological remains – mummies, Sun Temple reconstruction, Lake Tota

Tundama 

 Capital – Tundama
 Area – 
 Average elevation – 
 Last ruler – Tundama
 Date of conquest – Late December 1539 (Duitama) – Baltasar Maldonado
 Important settlements – Tundama, Onzaga, Soatá, Chitagoto (now Paz de Río)

Independent caciques 

 Capital – none
 Area – 
 Average elevation – 
 Important caciques – Guatavita, Ubaté, Chiquinquirá, Ubaque, Tenza, Vélez

Neighbouring indigenous groups 

 Panche
 Cariban-speaking
 frequent warfare
 beaten in the Battle of Tocarema
 pathways to gold
 conquest by Hernán Venegas Carrillo (1543–44)
 Muzo or The Emerald people
 Cariban-speaking
 trading access to western neighbours
 Furatena
 pathways to gold
 conquest by Luis Lanchero (1539–1559)
 Guane
 Chibcha-speaking
 producers of cotton for mantle making
 producers of fruits
 access to La Tora (Barrancabermeja); trading sea shells at Magdalena River
 conquest by Martín Galeano (1539–1551)

Sacred sites 

The sacred sites of the Muisca Confederation were based in the Muisca religion and mythology. The Muisca were a highly religious people with their own beliefs on the origin of the Earth and life and human sacrifices were no exception to please the gods for good harvests and prosperity.

Lake Guatavita, Guatavita, was the location where the new zipa would be inaugurated. It became known with the Spanish conquerors as the site of El Dorado where the new zipa was covered in gold dust and installed as the new ruler of the southern Muisca.

In the legends of the Muisca, mankind originated in Lake Iguaque, Monquirá, when the goddess Bachué came out from the lake with a boy in her arms. When the boy grew, they populated the Earth. They are considered the ancestors of the human race. Finally, they disappeared unto the lake in the shape of snakes.

According to Muisca myths, the Tequendama Falls, outside Soacha, was the site where the first zipa Meicuchuca lost his beautiful lover who turned in a snake and disappeared in the waters of the Bogotá River.

El Infiernito, close to the present town of Villa de Leyva was a sacred site where the Muisca erected structures based on astronomical parameters.

Other sacred sites 
 Sun Temple, Sogamoso
 Hunzahúa Well, Tunja
 Goranchacha Temple, Tunja
 Cojines del Zaque, Tunja
 Moon Temple, Chía

Spanish conquests

Conquest and early colonial period 

The conquest of the Muisca was the heaviest of all four Spanish expeditions to the great American civilisations. More than 80 percent of the soldiers and horses that started the journey of a year to the northern Muisca Confederation didn't make it. Various settlements were founded by the Spanish between 1537 and 1539.

A delegation of more than 900 men left the tropical city of Santa Marta and went on a harsh expedition through the heartlands of Colombia in search of El Dorado and the civilisation that produced all this precious gold. The leader of the first and main expedition under Spanish flag was Gonzalo Jiménez de Quesada, with his brother Hernán second in command. Several other soldiers were participating in the journey, who would later become encomenderos and taking part in the conquest of other parts of Colombia. Other contemporaneous expeditions into the unknown interior of the Andes, all searching for the mythical land of gold, were starting from later Venezuela, led by Bavarian and other German conquistadors and from the south, starting in the previously founded Kingdom of Quito in later Ecuador.

The first phase of the conquest was ended by the victory of the few conquistadors left over Tisquesusa, the last zipa of Bacatá, who fell and died "bathing in his own blood"after the battle at Funza, on the Bogotá savanna, April 20, 1537. The arrival of the Spanish conquerors was revealed to Tisquesusa by the mohan Popón, from the village of Ubaque. He told the Muisca ruler that foreigners were coming and Tisquesusa would die "bathing in his own blood". When Tisquesusa was informed of the advancing invasion of the Spanish soldiers, he sent a spy to Suesca to find out more about their army strength, weapons and with how many warriors they could be beaten. The zipa left the capital Bacatá and took shelter in Nemocón which directed the Spanish troops to there, during this march attacked by more than 600 Muisca warriors.

When Tisquesusa retreated in his fort in Cajicá he allegedly told his men he would not be able to combat against the strong Spanish army in possession of weapons that produced "thunder and lightning". He chose to return to Bacatá and ordered the capital to be evacuated, resulting in an abandoned site when the Spanish arrived. In search for the Muisca ruler the conquistadores went north to find Tisquesusa in the surroundings of Facatativá where they attacked him at night.

Tisquesusa was thrusted by the sword of one of De Quesada's soldiers but without knowing he was the zipa he let him go, after taking the expensive mantle of the ruler. Tisquesusa fled hurt into the mountains and died of his wounds there. His body was only discovered a year later because of the black vultures circling over it.

When Gonzalo Jiménez de Quesada found out the caciques were conspiring against him, he sent out several expeditions of soldiers. His captain Juan de Céspedes went south to found Pasca on July 15, 1537. Hernán was sent north and Gonzalo himself went northeast, to search for the mythical Land of Gold El Dorado. There he didn't find golden cities, but emeralds, the Muisca were extracting in Chivor and Somondoco. First foundation was Engativá, presently a locality of Bogotá, on May 22, 1537. Passing through Suba, Chía, Cajicá, Tocancipá, Gachancipá, Guatavita and Sesquilé, he arrived in Chocontá, founding the modern town on June 9. The journey went eastward into the Tenza Valley through Machetá, Tibiritá, Guateque, Sutatenza and Tenza, founded on San Juan; June 24. On the same day, Hernán founded Sutatausa. Gonzalo continued northwest through La Capilla and Úmbita. He arrived in Turmequé that he founded on July 20.

In August 1537 Gonzalo Jiménez de Quesada entered the territories of the zaque, who ruled from Hunza. When the Spanish conquerors entered the outskirts of Hunza and found a hill with poles were bodies were dangling, they named it Cerro de la Horca ("Gallow Hill"). At the time of the conquest Quemuenchatocha was the zaque and he ordered his men to not submit to the European invaders or show them the way to his bohío. He sent messengers to the Spanish conquistadors with valuable peace offers. While this was happening, Quemuenchatocha had hidden his treasures from the Spanish. Hunza was located in a valley not as green as the Bogotá savanna. The advantage of the Spanish weaponry and the use of the horses quickly beat the Muisca warriors.

When Gonzalo arrived at the main bohío of Quemuenchatocha, he found the Muisca ruler sitting in his throne and surrounded by his closest companions. All men were dressed in expensive mantles and adorned with golden crowns. On August 20, 1537, the Spanish beat the zaque and the big and strong Muisca ruler was taken captive to Suesca. There he was tortured and the Spanish soldiers hoped he would reveal where he hid his precious properties. The absence of Quemuenchatocha paved the route for his nephew Aquiminzaque to succeed him as ruler of the northern Muisca, a practice common in Muisca traditions. When Quemuenchatocha was finally released from captivity in Suesca, he fled to Ramiriquí, where he died shortly after. The Spanish soldiers found gold, emeralds, silver, mantles and other valuables in Tunja. They were not able to take all the precious pieces and many were secretly taken away by the Muisca, using folded deer skins. They hid the 
valuables in nearby hills.

I – Soldiers of the main expedition – Santa Marta-Funza and on – February – April 20, 1537

II & III – Soldiers of the expeditions De Belalcázar & Federmann (1535–1539)

I – 1 – Main expedition – inland and up from Chipatá to Funza – March – April 1537

I – 2 – Gonzalo – Tenza Valley – Conquest of Hunza & Sugamuxi – May – August 20 & September, 1537

3 – Hernán – Foundation of Sutatausa – June 24, 1537

4 – Juan de Céspedes – Southern savanna – 1537

5 – Juan de San Martín – 1537–1550

6 – Gonzalo et al. – Foundations of Bogotá and savanna

7 – Gonzalo Suárez Rendón – Foundation of Tunja – August 6, 1539

8 – Baltasar Maldonado – Conquest of Tundama – December 1539

9 – Hernán & Lázaro Fonte a.o. – 1540

Early colonial period 

Not only the Spanish settlers had lost large percentages of their men due to warfare and diseases. The assessed corregimientos of the Province of Tunja between 1537 and 1636 shows a decline of the total Muisca population between 65 and 85%. Epidemics were the main cause of the rapid reduction in population. Various have been reported and many undescribed in the first twenty years of contact.

After the foundation of Bogotá and the installation of the new dependency of the Spanish Crown, several strategies were important to the Spanish conquerors. The rich mineral resources of the Altiplano had to be extracted, the agriculture was quickly reformed, a system of encomiendas was installed and a main concern of the Spanish was the evangelisation of the Muisca. On October 9, 1549, Carlos V sent a royal letter to the New Kingdom directed at the priests about the necessity of population reduction of the Muisca. The indigenous people were working in the encomiendas which limited their religious conversion. To speed up the process of submittance to the Spanish reign, the mobility of the indigenous people was prohibited and the people gathered in resguardos. The formerly celebrated festivities in their religion disappeared. Specific times for the catechesis were controlled by laws, as executed in royal dictates in 1537, 1538 and 1551. The first bishop of Santafé, Juan de los Barrios, ordered to destroy the temples of the Muisca and replace them with Catholic churches. The last public religious ceremony of the Muisca religion was held in Ubaque on December 27, 1563. The second bishop of Santafé, Luis Zapata de Cárdenas, intensified the aggressive policies against the Muisca religion and the burnings of their sacred sites. This formed the final nail in the coffin of the former polytheistic society.

The transition to a mixed agriculture with Old World crops was remarkably fast, mainly to do with the fertility of the lands of the Altiplano permitting European crops to grow there, while in the more tropical areas the soil was not so much suited for the foreign crops. In 1555, the Muisca of Toca were growing European crops as wheat and barley and sugarcane was grown in other areas. The previously self-sustaining economy was quickly transformed into one based on intensive agriculture and mining that produced changes in the landscape and culture of the Muisca.

See also 

Maya civilization
 Sitio Sierra
Spanish conquest of the Muisca, Muisca art
Muisca economy, people
Muisca architecture, astronomy, mummies, warfare, women
Aztec Empire
Inca Empire

Notes

References

Bibliography and further reading

Spanish chroniclers 

 
 
 
 
 
 
 

 
Indigenous culture of the Americas
Altiplano Cundiboyacense
3
History of Colombia